The French Wikipedia is the French-language edition of Wikipedia, the free online encyclopedia. This edition was started on 23 March 2001, two months after the official creation of Wikipedia. It has the third-most edits, and ranks 6th in terms of depth among Wikipedias. It was also the third edition, after the English Wikipedia and German Wikipedia, to exceed 1 million articles: this occurred on 23 September 2010. In April 2016, the project had 4657 active editors who made at least five edits in that month.

In 2008, the French encyclopaedia Quid cancelled its 2008 edition, citing falling sales on competition from the French edition of Wikipedia.

On 2 December 2014, the French-language Wikipedia encyclopedia became the 3rd linguistic edition by number of registered users since its creation, overtaking for the first time the German edition, with  registered users, behind the English and Spanish language editions.

According to a 2013 study by Taha Yasseri et al., from Oxford Internet Institute, Ségolène Royal (FR) and unidentified flying object (objet volant non identifié) were the most controversial articles on the French Wikipedia.

Statistics 

The audience measurement company Médiamétrie questioned a sample of 8,500 users residing in France with access to Internet at home or at their place of work. Médiamétrie found that in June 2007, French Wikipedia had: 7,910,000 unique visitors that visited the site at least once during the month of June 2007 (compared to 4,355,000 unique visitors in June 2006); 2.7 visits per visitor during the period (2.0 visits in June 2006); had held the 12th position (21st in 2006) in "the Top 30 most visited sites in France, excluding Internet applications," according to the criterion of the number of unique visitors and 12th position in "the Top 30 most visited sites in France, including Internet applications," like eMule or Real Networks (22nd position in June 2006).

By August 2011, French Wikipedia was the 7th most visited site in France, with nearly 16 million unique visitors a month (according to Médiamétrie). In April 2012, it had 20 million unique visitors per month, or 2.4 million per day with over 700 million page views.

For the majority of the external links referenced in the articles, a program running on French Wikipedia automatically generates a link titled [archive], which is the union of two parts: the first one starts with http://archive.kiwix.com/cache/?url=, and the second is derived from the referenced URL. This feature has been created for the long-term digital preservation of the external references (so that the archive stays accessible even if the original reference is deleted).

References

External links 

 French Wikipedia website (mobile version)

Wikipedias by language
Internet properties established in 2001
Wikipedia
French encyclopedias
Wikipedias in Romance languages